Beilschmiedia kweo is a species of plant in the family Lauraceae. It is endemic to Tanzania.

References

Flora of Tanzania
kweo
Vulnerable plants
Taxonomy articles created by Polbot